Gurbachan Singh Manochahal (6 June 1954 – 28 February 1993) was a Sikh militant who founded the Bhindranwale Tiger Force of Khalistan in 1984.

Early life
Gurbachan Singh was born on 6 June 1954 in the village Manochahal, Tarn Taran district in the Indian state of Punjab to S. Atma Singh and Gurmej Kaur. He served in the Indian Army during his youth.

Manochahal was shot in the arm during the 1978 Sikh–Nirankari clashes. After this incident, he had maintained a relationship with Damdami Taksal and became acquainted with other members of the organization, such as Amrik Singh and Jarnail Singh Bhindranwale.

Insurgency
 Manochahal led a resolution at the 1986 Sarbat Khalsa to declare the resolve of a separate Sikh homeland and also formed a Panthic committee which would lead Sikhs per this resolution.

In 1992, a separate Panthic committee headed by Dr. Sohan Singh was formed. It called for the boycott of the 1992 Punjab Legislative Assembly election. Elections resulted in a Congress Government under Beant Singh of the Congress Party. The formation of this committee undermined the influence of Manochahal who was criticized for his support for political participation and led to a divide between the armed groups within Punjab.

Per Maloy Krishna Dhar, a former Joint Director, Intelligence Bureau, India, he was given the task to negotiate with Gurbachan Singh Manochahal. He contacted Manochahal through a journalist source, was blindfolded and taken a few hundred kilometres from Amritsar to meet with him where he secretly held negotiations for three hours before he was blindfolded again and transported back.

Death
Manochahal carried a bounty of 30 lakh on his head. Manochahal arrived cold and hungry in Rataul. He headed for what he thought was a secure hideout, where he might meet his companion. At Sukhvant vanchiree’s in-law’s home, he found only women. Sukhvant had gone out somewhere. Gurbachan Singh Manochahal was anxious to leave but the women assured Manochahal that Sukhvant would meet him in the morning. Sukhvant had been working for the police. The police had given the family a white powder that was to be given to Manochahal when he came. The police had warned them that if Baba Manochahal came to their house and got away, the entire family would be killed. The women warmed some milk and mixed the powder in it. They gave Manochahal the glass of milk and he quickly drank it. Manochahal drank poison from the hands of those he considered his own. The entire Indian Security Force could not do what Manochahal own had now done. Manochahal fell unconscious and then he Died.

The women told the DSP of Police that they had done their work. The entire Police Party rushed to Rataul. First they recorded the death of their most dreaded “terrorist” by taking pictures. They ripped Baba Manochahal's Turban off his head and dragged him into the grass.  After taking the initial pictures, they pumped bullets into Baba Manochahal body so they could report a spectacular “encounter”. They then took pictures with Baba Ji’s body. The cowards who had trembled at the name of “Manochahal” were now grabbing Baba Ji by his kes and laughing. Sukhvant too had arrived to join in the celebration. They fired shots into the air. The dreaded tiger had fallen. He was killed by poisoning on 28 February 1993. The chief of the Punjab Police, Kanwar Pal Singh Gill later proclaimed, "Now I can say that we have finished militancy in Punjab."

Bibliography
 https://www.sikhiwiki.org/index.php/Gurbachan_Singh_Manochal
https://www.1984tribute.com/shaheed-baba-gurbachan-singh-manochahal/

References

Khalistan movement people
1954 births
1993 deaths
Punjabi people
Indian Sikhs
Deaths by poisoning
Jathedars of Akal Takht
Insurgency in Punjab